Cătălin Ştefăniţă Crăciun (born 26 August 1991) is a Romanian football player, currently under contract with Universitatea Craiova.

External links
 

1991 births
Living people
Romanian footballers
FC U Craiova 1948 players
Association football forwards
Sportspeople from Craiova